This article contains a list of presidents of Villanova University:
 Rev. John P. O'Dwyer, OSA (1843–1847)
 Rev. William Harnett, OSA (1847–1848)
 Rev. John P. O'Dwyer, OSA (1848–1850)
 Rev. William Harnett, OSA (1850–1851)
 Rev. Patrick E. Moriarty, OSA (1851–1855)
 Rev. William Harnett, OSA (1855–1857)
 Rev. Ambrose A. Mullen, OSA (1865–1869)
 Rev. Patrick A. Stanton, OSA (1869–1872)
 Rev. Thomas Galberry, OSA (1872–1876)
 Rev. Thomas C. Middleton, OSA (1876–1878)
 Rev. John J. Fedigan, OSA (1878–1880)
 Rev. Joseph A. Coleman, OSA (1880–1886)
 Rev. Francis M. Sheeran, OSA (1886–1890)
 Rev. Christopher A. McEvoy, OSA (1890–1894)
 Rev. Francis J. McShane, OSA (1894–1895)
 Rev. Lawrence A. Delurey, OSA (1895–1910)
 Rev. Edward G. Dohan, OSA (1910–1917)
 Rev. James J. Dean, OSA (1917–1920)
 Rev. Francis A. Driscoll, OSA (1920–1924)
 Rev. Joseph A. Hickey, OSA (1924–1925)
 Rev. Mortimer A. Sullivan, OSA (1925–1926)
 Rev. James H. Griffin, OSA (1926–1932)
 Rev. Edward V. Stanford, OSA (1932–1944)
 Rev. Francis X. N. McGuire, OSA (1944–1954)
 Rev. James A. Donnellon, OSA (1954–1959)
 Rev. John A. Klekotka, OSA (1959–1965)
 Rev. Joseph A. Flaherty, OSA (1965–1967)
 Rev. Robert J. Welsh, OSA (1967–1971)
 Rev. Edward J. McCarthy, OSA (1971–1975)
 Rev. John M. Driscoll, OSA (1975–1988)
 Rev. Edmund J. Dobbin, OSA (1988–2006)
 Rev. Peter M. Donohue, OSA, PhD (2006–present)

References

 
Villanova
Villanova University presidents